The Carlos Palanca Memorial Awards for Literature winners in 1969 (rank, title of winning entry, name of author).


English division
Short story
First prize: “Un Bel Di” by Edith L. Tiempo
Second prize: “The Trial of Professor Riesco” by Luis Teodoro Jr.
Third prize: “The Icon” by Antonio R. Enriquez

Poetry
First prize: “Counter-clockwise: Poems 1965-1969 and Dark Sutra” by Federico Licsi Espino Jr.
Second prize: “Northward Into Noon” by Artemio Tadena
Third prize: “Black or Otherwise” by Jose M. Lansang Jr.

One-act play
First prize: “Dialogue” by Nestor Torre Jr.
Second prize: “Days of the Clock” by Jesus T. Peralta
Third prize: “The Summit” by Mar V. Puatu

Filipino division
Short story
First prize: “Huwag, Huwag Mong Kukuwentuhan Ang Batang Si Wei Fung” by Ricardo Lee
Second prize: “Mariang Makiling” by Eli Ang Barroso
Third prize: “Elias at Salome” by Domingo Landicho

Poetry
First prize: “May Luha ang Tula” by Aniceto Silvestre
Second prize: “Paraanin Ako” by Jose M. Buhain
Third prize: “Walong Tukod Langit” by Celestino M. Vega

One-act play
First prize: “Moses, Moses” by Rogelio Sicat
Second prize: “Neon” by Clodualdo Del Mundo
Third prize: “Ang Huling Pasiya” by Fernando L. Samonte

References
 

Palanca Awards
1969 literary awards